Donald Wilson (born 1949, Alta Vista, Kansas) is the founder and was the senior pastor of Christ's Church of the Valley in Peoria, Arizona, one of the largest churches in the United States, with an average attendance of nearly 28,000 a week across 9 locations. On January 28, 2017, Wilson announced his retirement, effective October 29, 2017.

Education
Wilson attended Manhattan Christian College, Kansas State University, and earned his Ph.D. from the California Graduate School of Theology.

Wilson and CCV
Don is the founder of Christ's Church of the Valley, which has been in existence since 1982; he began services in a rented movie theatre. Since that time, Christ's Church of the Valley has held services in an elementary school, a strip mall, and a building known as ‘The Castle’. In 1996, Christ's Church of the Valley raised over $1 million in one day, purchased  of land in the northwest area of Phoenix for a permanent home. In 2006, CCV raised over $8 million on one weekend for the Ripple Effect campaign. This campaign is built two new buildings for Children and Youth ministries. These buildings opened fall 2008.

For the first four years on the new property, Christ's Church of the Valley held services in a ‘sprung’ structure with seating for 1,100. After holding six identical services each weekend, in January 2004, Christ's Church of the Valley moved into their new 3,000 seat multi-use structure on the  campus. Christ's Church of the Valley has over 22,000 in attendance each weekend at multiple services.

Family and personal life
Wilson married his wife, Susan on August 9, 1968, and has three grown children, Paul, Kelli and Kristi, all of whom are involved in full-time ministry. Don also has eleven grandchildren, Madison, Russell, Riley, Marlee, Jacob, Garrett, Jenna, Suzanna, Mia, Whitney and Abigail. Four of his grandchildren are married. 

Don and Sue currently live in Peoria, Arizona.

References

1949 births
Living people
People from Wabaunsee County, Kansas
People from Peoria, Arizona
American Christian creationists
American Christian religious leaders